Considerations on Representative Government is a book by John Stuart Mill published in 1861.

Summary
Mill argues for representative government, the ideal form of government in his opinion. One of the more notable ideas Mill puts forth in the book is that the business of government representatives is not to make legislation. Instead Mill suggests that representative bodies such as parliaments and senates are best suited to be places of public debate on the various opinions held by the population and to act as watchdogs of the professionals who create and administer laws and policy. In his words:

References

External links
 Complete text of the book on Project Gutenberg
 

1861 books
Books about democracy
Books by John Stuart Mill
Books in political philosophy